A Very Special Christmas is the title of an ongoing series of Christmas music compilation albums that benefit the Special Olympics.  It features songs performed by artists from a variety of genres, such as U2, Stevie Nicks, Bon Jovi, Madonna, The Smashing Pumpkins, No Doubt, Whitney Houston, Run–D.M.C., Jason Mraz, Willie Nelson, Bruce Springsteen and Tom Petty and the Heartbreakers.

A Very Special Christmas was the idea of music producer Jimmy Iovine, who wanted to produce a Christmas album as a memorial to his father. The idea of the record benefiting the Special Olympics was suggested by Iovine's wife Vicki, as she was a volunteer for the organization. Herb Alpert and Jerry Moss, the founders of A&M Records, along with Bobby Shriver, helped the Iovines realize the project. Since the release of the first album in 1987, the series has raised over $100 million for the Special Olympics, more than any other benefit series.

All of the albums use the same cover art: a simplistic line drawing of a person holding a baby (an abstract representation of Mary holding baby Jesus) by Keith Haring in his usual style. Each album uses the artwork with a different color scheme.

A Very Special Christmas series
A Very Special Christmas (A&M Records, 1987)
A Very Special Christmas 2 (A&M Records, 1992)
A Very Special Christmas 3 (A&M Records, 1997)
A Very Special Christmas Live from Washington, D.C. (A&M Records, 1999)
A Very Special Christmas 5 (A&M Records, 2001)
A Very Special Acoustic Christmas (Lost Highway Records, 2003)
A Very Special Christmas 7 (A&M Records/UMe, 2009)
A Very Special Christmas: 25 Years Bringing Joy to the World  (Big Machine Records, 2012)
A Very Special Christmas: Bringing Peace on Earth (Word Records/Curb Records, 2012)
ICON: A Very Special Christmas (A&M Records/UMe, 2013)

Jazz to the World and World Christmas 
In 1995, the jazz-oriented Jazz to the World was released by Blue Note Records. In 1996, World Christmas, which focused on diverse artists from around the globe, was released by Blue Note subsidiary Metro Blue Records. Although they are not part of the main A Very Special Christmas series, the proceeds from these albums also benefitted the Special Olympics.

Jazz to the World
 "Winter Wonderland" – Herb Alpert/Jeff Lorber
 "Baby, It's Cold Outside" – Lou Rawls/Dianne Reeves
 "It Came Upon the Midnight Clear" – Fourplay
 "Have Yourself a Merry Little Christmas" – Diana Krall
 "O Tannenbaum" – Stanley Clarke/George Duke/Everette Harp
 "Let It Snow" – Michael Franks/Carla Bley/Steve Swallow
 "The Christmas Waltz" – The Brecker Brothers/Steve Kahn
 "The Little Drummer Boy" – Cassandra Wilson
 "I'll Be Home for Christmas" – Herbie Hancock/Eliane Elias
 "O Come, O Come, Emmanuel" – John McLaughlin
 "Christmas Blues" – Holly Cole
 "Angels We Have Heard on High" – Steps Ahead
 "The Christmas Song" – Anita Baker
 "What Child Is This?" – Chick Corea
 "Winter Wonderland" – Dave Koz
 "Il est né, le divin Enfant" – Dr. John

World Christmas
 "Angels We Have Heard on High/Les Anges Dans Nos Compagnes" – Papa Wemba/Mino Cinelu
 "We Three Kings" – Bob Berg/Jim Beard/Zakir Hussain/Mark Ledford
 "Go Tell It on the Mountain" – John Scofield/The Wild Magnolias
 "O Holy Night" (Zan Vevede) – Angélique Kidjo
 "Michaux Veillait/Santa Claus Is Coming to Town" – The Caribbean Jazz Project
 "Natal" – Cesária Évora
 "Ave Maria" – Deep Forest/Lokua Kanza
 "We Wish You a Merry Christmas/Rumba Navidene" – Vocal Sampling
 "Boas Festas" – Gilberto Gil/Caetano Veloso/Eliane Elias
 "Cascabel/Jingle Bells" – Yomo Toro and the Boricua All Stars
 "The Twelve Days of Christmas" – Mino Cinelu/Dianne Reeves
 "God Rest Ye Merry, Gentlemen" – Joshua Redman/Marcus Miller/Lalah Hathaway
 "Navidad" – Gipsy Kings

External links
Special Olympics official website
A Very Special Christmas official website

 
Compilation album series
1995 compilation albums
1996 compilation albums
Special Olympics
World music compilation albums